Badinabad-e Piran (also Romanized as Bādīnābād-e Pīrān and Badīnābād Pirān; also known as Badinaba, Bādīnābād, and Bādīnābād-e Pā'īn) is a village in Piran Rural District, in the Central District of Piranshahr County, West Azerbaijan Province, Iran. At the 2006 census, its population was 518, in 84 families.

References 

Populated places in Piranshahr County